The Mykonos Bienniale is held every odd year at the start of the summer on the Greek island of Mykonos, originally created by Lydia Venieri.

For one week at the end of June or the beginning of July, the island of Mykonos, hosts an extensive range of artworks, projects, and a program of events. The biennial commissions leading and emerging artists to make and present permanent and temporary public artworks, as well as long-term community-based projects.

See also
 Art exhibition
 Biennale

References

Greek contemporary art
Contemporary art exhibitions
Festivals in Greece
Art biennials
Tourist attractions in Greece
Art exhibitions in Greece
Summer events in Greece